Suladale or Suledale is a small mixed crofting hamlet of fewer than a dozen houses, located near Edinbane,  on the north of the island of Skye, in the Highlands of Scotland and is in the Scottish council area of Highland.

References

Populated places in the Isle of Skye